Strembo (Stremp in local dialect) is a comune (municipality) in Trentino in the northern Italian region of Trentino-Alto Adige/Südtirol, located about  west of Trento.

Strembo borders the following municipalities: Vermiglio, Giustino, Spiazzo, Caderzone, Massimeno, Daone and Bocenago.

Demographic evolution

References

Cities and towns in Trentino-Alto Adige/Südtirol